Georges Island Lighthouse is a prominent concrete lighthouse, built in 1917 on Georges Island (Nova Scotia), which replaced an earlier tower built in 1876.  The light-keeper's house remains standing a few hundred feet to the north. The lighthouse is operated by the Canadian Coast Guard.

History
The lighthouse was automated in 1972, and in 2005 the foghorn was decommissioned.

In the summer of 2006 the lighthouse was used by the U.S. Navy in training exercises.

List of lighthouse keepers
1876–1920 Ross, Robert
1920–1946 Nolan, W.H.
1921 Ross, S.
1921 Ross, J.
1946 Bedgood, H.J.
1946 Edwards, E.J.
1946–1964 Matthews, Victor Maynard
1964–1972 Barkhouse, D.D.

See also
List of lighthouses in Canada

References

External links

Georges Island Lighthouse at the Nova Scotia Lighthouse Preservation Society
 Aids to Navigation Canadian Coast Guard

Lighthouses completed in 1876
Lighthouses completed in 1917
Lighthouses in Nova Scotia